Bowling and Barkerend is a ward in the metropolitan borough of the City of Bradford, West Yorkshire, England.  It contains 31 listed buildings that are recorded in the National Heritage List for England.  Of these, one is listed at Grade I, the highest of the three grades, two are at Grade II*, the middle grade, and the others are at Grade II, the lowest grade.   The ward covers an area to the east of the centre of Bradford, and is largely residential.  In the ward is Undercliffe Cemetery, and a number of monuments in the cemetery are listed.  Most of the other listed buildings are houses and cottages, and the other listed buildings include schools, churches, public houses, and a former textile mill, 


Key

Buildings

References

Citations

Sources

 

Lists of listed buildings in West Yorkshire
Listed